I Think This Is is a studio album by Young Fresh Fellows, released on Yep Roc Records in 2009. It was released the same day as Scott McCaughey's other project The Minus 5's Killingsworth. The album was recorded at the behest of former Soft Boys member and friend Robyn Hitchcock, who offered to produce it. McCaughey had previously approached Hitchcock to produce an album 20 years prior, but the two couldn't arrange for an in-studio collaboration until they had toured together and several of the Fellows worked on his Jewels for Sophia.

Reception
Mark Deming of Allmusic gave the album 3.5 out of five stars, calling it, "unusually focused and coherent-sounding" even as it transcends narrow genre definitions. PopMatters' Ron Hart awarded the album a 9 out of 10, agreeing that it is the most cohesive release from The Young Fresh Fellows and declared it their best album.

Track listing
"The Guilty Ones" (Scott McCaughey) – 2:19
"Lamp Industries" (Kurt Bloch) – 2:02
"Suck Machine Crater" (McCaughey) – 2:55
"Let the Good Times Crawl" (Peter Buck, McCaughey) – 2:32
"Never Turning Back Again" (McCaughey) – 2:21
"New Day I Hate" (Bloch) – 2:01
"Go Blue Angels Go" (McCaughey) – 1:36
"Used to Think All Things Would Happen" (Chris Ballew, Tad Hutchinson) – 3:05
"YOUR Mexican Restaurant" (McCaughey) – 2:23
"Shake Your Magazines" (Ballew, Hutchinson) – 3:00
"After Suicide" (McCaughey) – 1:48
"If You Believe in Cleveland" (McCaughey) – 3:55
"Ballad of the Bootleg" (McCaughey) – 2:42

I Don't Think This Is track listing
"Suck Machine Crater" (McCaughey) – 2:55
"Let the Good Times Crawl" (Buck, McCaughey) – 2:32
"Never Turning Back Again" (McCaughey) – 2:21
"New Day I Hate" (Bloch) – 2:01
"Go Blue Angels Go" (McCaughey) – 1:36
"Gotta Get Away" (Mick Jagger, Keith Richards) – 1:42
"The Guilty Ones" (McCaughey) – 2:19
"The Final Tractor" (McCaughey) – 1:57
"After Suicide" (McCaughey) – 1:48
"Lay You in the Ground" (McCaughey) – 1:52
"If You Believe in Cleveland" (McCaughey) – 3:55
"Lamp Industries" (Kurt Bloch) – 2:02
"Shake Your Magazines" (Ballew, Hutchison) – 3:00

Personnel
The Young Fresh Fellows
Chris Ballew – composition, bass guitar, instrumentation
Kurt Bloch – composition, guitar, engineering
Tad Hutchison – composition, drums, instrumentation, vocals
Scott McCaughey – composition, guitar, instrumentation, vocals
Jim Sangster – bass guitar

Additional personnel
Peter Buck – composition, 12-string guitar
Robyn Hitchcock – guitar, production, vocals

References

External links
Yep Roc's release statement

2009 albums
Albums produced by Robyn Hitchcock
The Young Fresh Fellows albums
Yep Roc Records albums